The Golf Coaches Association of America (GCAA) is a non-profit organization that is a professional association of men’s collegiate golf coaches.  It was founded in 1958, and is located on 1225 West Main Street in Norman, Oklahoma.

The GCAA has over 750 members, representing the three NCAA divisions, NAIA, and NJCAA.

Ben Hogan Award

Hall of fame
The GCAA Hall of Fame began in 1980, for outstanding college golf coaches. Starting in 1985, the Hall of Fame presents each year the GCAA's highest coaching award, the Honor Award, to a living member of the Hall of Fame.

References

External links
 Golf Coaches Association of America website

G
Golf in the United States
Golf associations
Golf instruction
Amateur golf
Non-profit organizations based in Oklahoma
Sports organizations established in 1958
1958 establishments in the United States
College sports in Oklahoma
Norman, Oklahoma